The , was a six-hour confrontation between the Japan Coast Guard and an armed North Korean vessel on 22 December 2001, taking place near the Japanese island of Amami Ōshima, in the East China Sea. The encounter ended in the sinking of the North Korean vessel, which the Japanese authorities later announced was determined to have been a spy craft. The encounter took place outside Japanese territorial waters, but within the exclusive economic zone, an area extending  from Japanese land, within which Japan can claim exclusive rights to fishing and mineral resources.

Background
An unidentified ship was spotted in Japanese waters on 21 December 2001. The armed trawler was detected by a communications station in Kikaijima, Kagoshima, which was under control of the Japanese Defense Intelligence Headquarters. In 1999, another North Korean vessel encountered by the Japanese Coast Guard was claimed by Japan to have been a spy craft, though North Korea denied it.

Battle

Early the following morning, the ship was chased by four Japan Coast Guard vessels, who ordered it to halt, and fired 25 warning shots upon the ship when those orders were ignored. A six-hour firefight ensued, in which over 1,000 machine gun rounds were fired by both sides; the North Korean crew were said to have wielded shoulder-held rocket launchers. The North Korean trawler was meanwhile hit by a number of  rounds. Several explosions not directly related to Japanese attacks rocked the ship before it was sunk. According to The Guardian, "fifteen survivors were seen clinging to a buoy in heavy seas, but the Japanese ships were ordered to ignore them because of fears that they would use force to resist capture". Two bodies were recovered, thirteen more persons were declared missing and presumed dead several days later.

The Special Boarding Unit was mobilized to board the ship, but did not do so as they had to wait for official orders from the Japanese Defense Agency. The ship sank before such orders arrived.

Aftermath

In 2003 the trawler was raised by the Japanese to confirm its origin and intentions. Inspection of the hull determined it was of North Korean origin and most likely an infiltration and spy vessel. It was revealed that the vessel was camouflaged as a Chinese or Japanese fishing boat and that it could go , far faster than any commercial trawler. The ship also contained a hidden double-hatch located in the stern to be used as an exit door for speedboats. Once the inspections were completed, the hull was displayed at the Japan Coast Guard Museum Yokohama in Yokohama, where the trawler became a popular tourist attraction.

See also
 Fushin-sen - Battle of Amami-Ōshima is one of the most notable Fushin-sen type of incidents

References

Citations

Bibliography

2001 in Japan
Amami-Ōshima
Maritime incidents in 2001
Amami-Oshima
Amami-Oshima
Amami-Ōshima
2001 in North Korea
Naval trawlers
Combat incidents
Japan–North Korea relations
December 2001 events in Asia
Battles in 2001